The 1994 Hooters 500 was the 31st and final stock car race of the 1994 NASCAR Winston Cup Series season and the 35th iteration of the event. The race was held on Sunday, November 12, 1994, in Hampton, Georgia, at Atlanta Motor Speedway, a  permanent asphalt quad-oval intermediate speedway. The race took the scheduled 328 laps to complete. At race's end, Roush Racing driver Mark Martin would manage to dominate the late stages of the race to take his 14th career NASCAR Winston Cup Series victory and his second and final victory of the season. To fill out the top three, Richard Childress Racing driver Dale Earnhardt and Butch Mock Motorsports driver Todd Bodine would finish second and third, respectively.

The race marked the final Winston Cup Series start for long-time driver Harry Gant. Gant would retire from the race due to a burnt piston, finishing 33rd.

Background 

Atlanta Motor Speedway (formerly Atlanta International Raceway) is a 1.522-mile race track in Hampton, Georgia, United States, 20 miles (32 km) south of Atlanta. It has annually hosted NASCAR Winston Cup Series stock car races since its inauguration in 1960.

The venue was bought by Speedway Motorsports in 1990. In 1994, 46 condominiums were built over the northeastern side of the track. In 1997, to standardize the track with Speedway Motorsports' other two intermediate ovals, the entire track was almost completely rebuilt. The project made the track one of the fastest on the NASCAR circuit.

Entry list 

 (R) - denotes rookie driver.

Qualifying 
Qualifying was split into two rounds. The first round was held on Friday, November 11, at 2:00 PM EST. Each driver would have one lap to set a time. During the first round, the top 20 drivers in the round would be guaranteed a starting spot in the race. If a driver was not able to guarantee a spot in the first round, they had the option to scrub their time from the first round and try and run a faster lap time in a second round qualifying run, held on Saturday, November 12, at 11:00 AM EST. As with the first round, each driver would have one lap to set a time. For this specific race, positions 21-40 would be decided on time, and depending on who needed it, a select amount of positions were given to cars who had not otherwise qualified but were high enough in owner's points; up to two provisionals were given. If needed, a past champion who did not qualify on either time or provisionals could use a champion's provisional, adding one more spot to the field.

13 drivers would fail to qualify.

Full qualifying results

Race results

Standings after the race 

Drivers' Championship standings

Note: Only the first 10 positions are included for the driver standings.

References 

1994 NASCAR Winston Cup Series
NASCAR races at Atlanta Motor Speedway
November 1994 sports events in the United States
1994 in sports in Georgia (U.S. state)